Magomed Baachilov (ru)
 Vitaly Babakov (ru)
 Sergey Bavilin (ru)
 Sergey Bavykin (ru)
 Sergey Bagaev (ru)
 Khamzat Badakhov (ru)
 Nikolai Bairov (ru)
 Vadim Baykulov (ru)
 Aleksey Balandin (ru)
 Vladimir Balashov (ru)
 Aleksandr Baranov
 Radik Bariev (ru)
 Sergey Barinov (ru)
 Vladimir Barkovsky (ru)
 Yevgeny Barmyantsev (ru)
 Sergey Basurmanov (ru)
 Rizvan Baskhanov (ru)
 Igor Batalov (ru)
 Zeynudin Batmanov (ru)
 Yuri Baturin
 Aleksey Baukin (ru)
 Ruslan Batsaev (ru)
 Bakhtyuras Besikbayev
 Oleg Belaventsev
 Eduard Belan (ru)
 Vladimir Belov (ru)
 Aleksandr Belodedov (ru)
 Vladimir Belyaevsky (ru)
 Mikhail Belyaev (ru)
 Nikolai Belyaev (ru)
 Aleksandr Berzin
 Roman Bersenev (ru)
 Aleksandr Beschastnov (ru)
 Soltan-Khamid Bidzhiev (ru)
 Aleksandr Blokhin (ru)
 Yevgeny Bobrov (ru)
 Sergey Bogatikov (ru)
 Andrey Bogatov (ru)
 Sergey Bogdan
 Sergey Bogdanchenko (ru)
 Vladimir Bogodukhov (ru)
 Aleksandr Bogomolov (ru)
 Dmitry Boaev (ru)
 Aleksandr Boykov (ru)
 Pavel Boyko (ru)
 Vladimir Bokovikov (ru)
 Vladimir Bolysov (ru)
 Viktor Bondarev
 Sergey Bondarev (ru)
 Aleksandr Bondarenko (ru)
 Oleg Bondarenko (ru)
 Sergey Borin (ru)
 Aleksandr Borisevich (ru)
 Andrey Borisenko
 Yevgeny Borisov (ru)
 Sergey Borisov (ru)
 Yuri Borisov
 Sergey Borisyuk (ru)
 Vladimir Borovikov (ru)
 Aleksey Botyan
 Ivan Bokhonko (ru)
 Andrey Bocharov
 Vyacheslav Bocharov (ru)
 Mikhail Bochenkov (ru)
 Aleksey Brovkovich (ru)
 Nina Brusnikova
 Vasily Bryukhov (ru)
 Vitaly Bugaev (ru)
 Igor Bugay (ru)
 Yekaterina Budanova
 Viktor Budantsev (ru)
 Nikolai Budarin
 Aleksandr Buzin (ru)
 Vladimir Bulgakov (ru)
 Dmitry Bulgakov
 Aleksey Burilichev (ru)
 Sergey Burnaev (ru)
 Vladimir Burtsev (ru)
 Aleksey Bukhanov (ru)
 Yuri Buchnev (ru)
 Yevgeny Bushmelev (ru)
 Ivan Bykov (ru)
 Georgy Bystritsky (ru)
 Nikolai Bystritsky (ru)

References 
 

Heroes B